Lucas Armando Mareque Buccolini (born 12 January 1983) is an Argentine retired football left back.

Career
Mareque started his career with River Plate in 2004. In 2007, he was transferred to Porto, where he made his league debut against União de Leiria on January 26. During his time at Porto, the club won the Primeira Liga.

After playing for Porto, Mareque returned to Argentina to play for Independiente on loan during the 2007 Apertura tournament. In the beginnings of 2008, Mareque was bought by Independiente as a permanent player.

In July 2011 he signed for the Ligue 1 club Lorient.

Honours
Porto
Primeira Liga: 2007–08

Independiente
Copa Sudamericana: 2010

References

External links
 Argentine Primera statistics at Fútbol XXI 

1983 births
Living people
People from Morón Partido
Association football fullbacks
Argentine footballers
Argentine expatriate footballers
Argentine Primera División players
Primeira Liga players
Ligue 1 players
Club Atlético River Plate footballers
FC Porto players
FC Lorient players
Club Atlético Independiente footballers
Deportivo Español footballers
Expatriate footballers in Portugal
Expatriate footballers in France
Sportspeople from Buenos Aires Province